Bukanovskaya is a rural locality (a stanitsa) and the administrative center of Bukanovskoye Rural Settlement, Kumylzhensky District, Volgograd Oblast, Russia. The population was 953 as of 2010. There are 13 streets.

Geography 
Bukanovskaya is located on the right bank of the Khopyor River, 37 km southwest of Kumylzhenskaya (the district's administrative centre) by road. Zaolkhovsky is the nearest rural locality.

References 

Rural localities in Kumylzhensky District
Don Host Oblast